Occipital protuberance can refer to:
 Internal occipital protuberance
 External occipital protuberance